Susej Vera (born Venezuela, June 14 of 1976) is a television actress, singer and model. She has, since 2001, appeared in several telenovela television series that have been broadcast in several countries.

Filmography  

 Mi ex me tiene ganas (2012) Rebeca Patiño "Queca"
 La Viuda Joven (2011) as Macarena Black
 Torrente (telenovela) (2008) as Corina Pereira.
 Ciudad Bendita (2006) as Valentina.
 Sabor a ti (2004).
 ¡Qué buena se puso Lola! (2004) as Amanda.
 La Mujer de Judas (2002) as Lorena.
 La niña de mis ojos (2001) as Amparo Rotundo.

External links 

 

1976 births
Venezuelan female models
20th-century Venezuelan women singers
Venezuelan telenovela actresses
Living people
21st-century Venezuelan women singers